The 2012 Currie Cup First Division was contested from 30 June to 13 October 2012.  The tournament (also known as the Absa Currie Cup First Division for sponsorship reasons) is the second tier of South Africa's premier domestic rugby union competition, featuring teams representing either entire provinces or substantial regions within provinces.

Competition

Regular season and title playoffs
There were 8 participating teams in the 2012 Currie Cup First Division. These teams played each other twice over the course of the season, once at home and once away.

Teams received four points for a win and two points for a draw. Bonus points were awarded to teams that scored 4 or more tries in a game, as well as to teams losing a match by 7 points or less. Teams were ranked by points, then points difference (points scored less points conceded).

The top 4 teams qualified for the title play-offs. In the semi-finals, the team that finished first had home advantage against the team that finished fourth, while the team that finished second had home advantage against the team that finished third. The winners of these semi-finals played each other in the final, at the home venue of the higher-placed team.

Promotion playoffs
The top team on the log will also qualify for the promotion/relegation play-offs. That team will play off against the team placed sixth in the 2012 Currie Cup Premier Division over two legs. The winner over these two ties (determined via team tables, with all Currie Cup ranking regulations in effect) will qualify for the 2013 Currie Cup Premier Division, while the losing team will qualify for the 2013 Currie Cup First Division.

Teams

Changes from 2011

Team Listing

Table

Fixtures and results
All times are South African (GMT+2).

Regular season

Round one

Round two

Round three

Round four

Round Five

Round Six

Round Seven

Round Eight

Round Nine

Round Ten

Round Eleven

Round Twelve

Round Thirteen

Round Fourteen

Title Play-Off Games

Semi-finals

Final

Players

Player Statistics

Leading try scorers
{| class="wikitable"
|-
!colspan=4 | Top 10 try scorers
|-
!Pos
!Name
!Team
!Tries
|- style="background:#d0ffd0;"
|           align=center |  1 || Allister Kettledas ||                 || align=center |  14
|-
|           align=center |  2 || Luke Watson        ||   || align=center |  12
|-
|           align=center |  3 || JW Jonker          ||                    || align=center |  11
|-
| rowspan=3 align=center |  4 || JW Bell            ||                  || align=center |  9
|-
|                                Jaco Bouwer        ||                    || align=center |  9
|-
|                                Cornell du Preez   ||   || align=center |  9
|-
| rowspan=3 align=center |  7 || Brendon April      ||         || align=center |  8
|-
|                                Johan Herbst       ||               || align=center |  8
|-
|                                Elric van Vuuren   ||               || align=center |  8
|-
| rowspan=6 align=center | 10 || Alshaun Bock       ||               || align=center |  7
|-
|                                Danie Dames        ||                 || align=center |  7
|-
|                                Stompie de Wet      ||                 || align=center |  7
|-
|                                Shane Hancke       ||                 || align=center |  7
|-
|                                Franzel September  ||         || align=center |  7
|-
|                                Elgar Watts        ||         || align=center |  7
|}
Source: South African Rugby Union

Leading point scorers

Source: South African Rugby Union

See also
 2012 Currie Cup Premier Division
 2012 Vodacom Cup
 2012 Under-21 Provincial Championship
 2012 Under-19 Provincial Championship

References

External links
 
 

2012
2012 Currie Cup